Crambus braunellus is a moth in the family Crambidae. It was described by Alexander Barrett Klots in 1940. It is found in North America, where it has been recorded from California and Maryland.

References

Crambini
Moths described in 1940
Moths of North America